The 1987 Bavarian Tennis Championships was a men's Grand Prix Tennis Circuit tournament held on outdoor clay courts at the MTTC Iphitos in Munich, West Germany. The tournament was held from 4 May through 11 May 1987. It is now part of the ATP Tour. Unseeded Guillermo Pérez Roldán won the singles title.

Finals

Singles

 Guillermo Pérez Roldán defeated  Marián Vajda 6–3, 7–6
 It was Perez-Roldan's 1st singles title of the year and of his career.

Doubles

 Jim Pugh /  Blaine Willenborg defeated  Sergio Casal /  Emilio Sánchez 7–6, 4–6, 6–4
 It was Pugh's 3rd title of the year and the 3rd of his career. It was Willenborg's 1st title of the year and the 6th of his career.

References

External links 
 ITF tournament edition details
 ATP tournament profile
 Official website

Bavarian Tennis Championships
Bavarian Tennis Championships
 
Bavarian Tennis Championships
Bavarian Tennis Championships
Bavarian International Tennis Championships
German